Gervase of Tilbury (1150–1220) was an English canon lawyer, statesman and cleric. He enjoyed the favour of Henry II of England and later of Henry's grandson, Emperor Otto IV, for whom he wrote his best known work, the Otia Imperialia.

Life and works
Gervase was of the son of a knight of the Honor of Rayleigh.  He was born around 1150 in West Tilbury, in Essex, a manor in the hands of Henry of Essex, although some say that he brought up in Rome, this is highly improbable 

He travelled widely, studied and taught canon law at Bologna, was in Venice in 1177, at the reconciliation of Pope Alexander III and Frederick Barbarossa, and spent some time in the service of Henry II of England, and of his son, "Henry the Young King". For the latter he composed a Liber facetiarum (‘Book of entertainment’), now lost, as well as the basis for what would become the Otia Imperialia. He also served William of the White Hands, the brother of the Count of Blois William of Champagne, Archbishop of Reims (where Gervase's famous attempt to seduce an unwilling girl precipitated her condemnation by the archbishop as a cathar). 

Some time after 1183 Gervase found service at the court of William II, the Norman king of Sicily, who had married Henry's daughter Joan. From William he received the gift of a villa at Nola in Campania. After the King of Sicily's death in 1189, Gervase moved to Arles and became a judge of canon law. In 1198, Otto –  the Holy Roman Emperor after 1209– appointed Gervase Marshal of the Kingdom of Burgundy-Arles,Gervase married into a local family (which bought him a palace). Gervase accompanied Otto to Rome in 1209 on the occasion of his Imperial coronation. The following year Gervase was enmeshed in the papacy's struggle with his patron Otto, who was excommunicated by Pope Innocent III. Gervase employed the next years, from 1210 to 1214, writing the Otia Imperialia ("Recreation for an Emperor") for his patron. He also wrote a Vita abbreviata et miracula beatissimi Antonii ("Shortened life and miracles of the most blessed Antony") and a Liber de transitu beate virginis et gestis discipulorum ("Book of the passing of the blessed virgin and acts of the disciples").

Details of his latter years are uncertain. It has been suggested that, after the resounding defeat of Otto and his English ally John at the Battle of Bouvines (1214), Gervase was forced to retire to the duchy of Braunschweig, where he became, and died, provost of Ebstorf, and it is apparent that his work was known to the authors of the Ebstorf world map ( 1234–40). However, it is recorded by Ralph of Coggeshall that he became a canon in later life, and other evidence suggests that he may have been a member of the Premonstratensians of l'Huveaune.

Notes

References

Bibliography

 

13th-century Latin writers
Canon law jurists
English encyclopedists
1150s births
1220s deaths
Year of birth uncertain
Year of death uncertain
People from West Tilbury
13th-century English lawyers
12th-century English jurists